Norm Oliver or Norman Oliver may refer to:

 Norm Oliver (footballer, born 1885) (1885–1938), Australian rules footballer for Collingwood
 Norm Oliver (footballer, born 1922) (1922–1944), Australian rules footballer for Collingwood